CUTE-1.7 + APD II, or CUTE-1.7 + APD 2, is a Japanese nanosatellite which was launched in 2008 as a follow-up to the CUTE-1.7 + APD satellite. It was built and is operated by the Tokyo Institute of Technology.

Spacecraft 
CUTE-1.7 + APD II used a similar design to its predecessor, however it was stretched in height meaning that it no longer complied with the CubeSat form factor which the original satellite was based on. The onboard computer is a personal digital assistant developed by Hitachi.

Mission 
The University of Toronto Institute for Aerospace Studies was contracted to launch CUTE-1.7 + APD II, subcontracting the launch to the Indian Space Research Organisation (ISRO) as part of the Nanosatellite Launch Service 4 (NLS-4) mission along with CanX-2, AAUSAT-II, Compass-1, Delfi-C3 and SEEDS-2. ISRO used a Polar Satellite Launch Vehicle, flight number C9, to launch NLS-4 - with the rocket flying in the Core Alone, or PSLV-CA, configuration. The rocket's primary payload was Cartosat-2A, with IMS-1, Rubin-8 and the University of Toronto's NLS-5 mission - consisting of the CanX-6 satellite - also flying aboard the launch vehicle as secondary payloads.

Launch 
The launch took place at 03:53:51 UTC on 28 April 2008, with the satellites being deployed from the launch vehicle shortly afterwards. Although only designed for a two-month mission, it still remains operational and continues to transmit data to the ground station at the Tokyo Institute of Technology.

References 

Spacecraft launched in 2008
Student satellites